Richard Harvey Walter (June 19, 1920 – October 15, 2016) was an American politician in the state of Iowa. Walter was born in Council Bluffs, Iowa. He attended Omaha University and was a businessman. He served in the Iowa House of Representatives from 1969 to 1971 as a Republican.

References

1920 births
2016 deaths
People from Council Bluffs, Iowa
University of Nebraska Omaha alumni
Businesspeople from Iowa
Republican Party members of the Iowa House of Representatives
20th-century American businesspeople